Hubert Prokop may refer to:
 Hubert Prokop (basketball)
 Hubert Prokop (wrestler)